Davy Arnaud (born June 22, 1980) is an American soccer coach and former player. During his professional career, he played for Sporting Kansas City, Montreal Impact, and D.C. United, and served on the coaching staff of D.C. United and Houston Dynamo. Arnaud also made seven appearances for the United States national team, scoring one goal. He is currently an assistant coach at Austin FC.

Career

College
Arnaud played college soccer at West Texas A&M University from 1999 to 2001, finishing his career with 31 goals and 11 assists. In his junior year he scored 13 goals and 3 assists, becoming a Division II NCAA All-American, the first from his school.

Professional
After his junior year, Arnaud turned professional, and was drafted 50th overall in the 2002 MLS SuperDraft by the Kansas City Wizards. He hardly played at all his first year, registering only 43 minutes in three games. Although his second year began much the same, Arnaud began to get significant time as the year progressed, and finished the year having played in 18 games, and scored three goals. Although his performance in 2003 boded well for his 2004 season, Arnaud exceeded everybody's expectations. After Preki and Igor Simutenkov went down with long-term injuries before the beginning of the season, Arnaud was given a starting role in the Wizards' offense next to Josh Wolff.  Arnaud proved he deserved the opportunity from the outset, and went on to start all 30 of Kansas City's games, scoring nine goals and eight assists while leading the club to first place in the Western Conference.

Arnaud remained a starter for the club for the next several years. Before the 2010 season, Arnaud was named the team's new captain by coach Peter Vermes. During the 2011 season injuries limited his play but he still remained a key player for the club helping Sporting to a first place Eastern Conference finish during the regular season.

On November 28, 2011, Arnaud was traded to new expansion team Montreal Impact for defender Seth Sinovic and allocation money. He was named captain of the Montreal Impact for the team's first season in Major League Soccer. On March 17, 2012, before a crowd of 58,912 at Olympic Stadium in Montreal, Arnaud scored the first ever goal for the Montreal Impact in MLS in the 56th minute by heading a cross from Sanna Nyassi into the top right corner against Chicago Fire keeper Paolo Tornaghi.

On December 10, 2013, Arnaud was traded to D.C. United in exchange for an international roster slot.

On March 3, 2016, Arnaud officially announced his retirement. In his professional career he played 351 games, scored 50 goals, and recorded 46 assists.

Coaching
Upon retirement from playing, Arnaud immediately joined the D.C. United's coaching staff as an assistant coach.

Arnaud joined the Houston Dynamo in late 2016 as an assistant coach, joining Wilmer Cabrera back in his native Texas. Upon Cabrera's departure from the club after a 9–13–3 start to the 2019 season, Arnaud was elevated to the role of interim head coach. Arnaud went 3–5–1 in the interim role before Tab Ramos was named permanent head coach.

On July 13, 2020, Arnaud was named assistant coach for Austin FC, joining Josh Wolff's staff for the expansion club's inaugural campaign.

International
Arnaud made his first appearance for the United States national team as a late substitute during the U.S.'s 4–2 friendly defeat against Brazil on September 9, 2007 at Soldier Field in Chicago.  He scored his first international goal on July 11, 2009 against Haiti in the 2009 CONCACAF Gold Cup at Gillette Stadium in Foxboro, Massachusetts.

International goals

Honors

Kansas City Wizards / Sporting Kansas City

Kansas City Wizards
Lamar Hunt U.S. Open Cup: 2004
Major League Soccer Western Conference Championship: 2004

Sporting Kansas City
Sporting Legends (Club Hall of Fame): 2022

Montreal Impact
Canadian Championship: 2013

Notes

References

External links

1980 births
Living people
People from Nederland, Texas
American soccer players
American expatriate soccer players
Sporting Kansas City players
CF Montréal players
D.C. United players
United States men's international soccer players
Soccer players from Texas
2009 CONCACAF Gold Cup players
Expatriate soccer players in Canada
Sporting Kansas City draft picks
Major League Soccer coaches
Major League Soccer players
Major League Soccer All-Stars
D.C. United non-playing staff
Houston Dynamo FC non-playing staff
Association football midfielders
Houston Dynamo FC coaches
American soccer coaches
Austin FC non-playing staff